The UIS Prairie Stars (also Illinois–Springfield Prairie Stars and formerly Sangamon State Prairie Stars) are the athletic teams that represent the University of Illinois Springfield, located in Springfield, Illinois, in intercollegiate sports as a member of the Division II level of the National Collegiate Athletic Association (NCAA), primarily competing in the Great Lakes Valley Conference (GLVC) since the 2009–10 academic year, which they became a full-fledged Division II member on Aug. 1, 2010. The Prairie Stars previously competed in the American Midwest Conference (AMC) of the National Association of Intercollegiate Athletics (NAIA) from 2003–04 to 2008–09.

Varsity teams

UIS competes in 15 intercollegiate varsity sports: Men's sports include baseball, basketball, cross country, golf, soccer, tennis and track & field (indoor and outdoor); while women's sports include basketball, cross country, golf, soccer, softball, tennis, track & field (indoor and outdoor) and volleyball.

Accomplishments
In 2018, both the baseball and softball programs won GLVC Conference Championships and hosted NCAA Regionals.

The UIS Baseball team has earned the number one seed in the NCAA Division II Midwest Regional in three straight seasons.

Championships
While a member of the NAIA, the Prairie Stars won the NAIA national men's soccer championship in 1986, 1988, and 1993 and were runner-up in 1998.

References

External links
 

 

 
University of Illinois at Springfield